Abrotanella linearifolia is a member of the daisy family and is found in Chile, South America.

References

linearifolia
Taxa named by Asa Gray